The Golden West Pace is a defunct three-race series in harness racing for Standardbred pacers aged three and older. It was first run in 1946 with a purse of $50,000 which at the time was the richest offered in the sport. The race final was hosted on an alternating basis, until the final running in 1954, by Santa Anita Park in Arcadia, California, and Hollywood Park Racetrack in Inglewood, California. During the same period, these tracks also offered the corresponding Golden West Trot.

Historical race events
Canceled after the 1954 running, the Golden West Pace would prove to be the precursor to the American Pacing Classic run exclusively at Hollywood Park from 1955 through 1981.

Records
 Most wins by a driver
 2 – Edward G. Cobb (1949, 1950) & Benny Schue (1952, 1953)

 Most wins by a trainer
 2 – Edward G. Cobb (1949, 1950) & Benny Schue (1952, 1953)

 Stakes record
 2:30 3/5 – Dudley Hanover (1952) at 1 1/4 miles
 2:22 1/5 – Dudley Hanover (1953) at 1 3/16 miles

Winners of the Golden West Pace

References

Santa Anita Park
Hollywood Park Racetrack
Harness races in the United States
Discontinued harness races
Sports in Los Angeles